

The Blériot-SPAD S.91 was a French light-weight fighter aircraft. It would be later developed into the Blériot-SPAD S.510, the last biplane produced by the French aeronautic industries.

Development
The S.91 was a single-seat single-bay biplane developed towards the end of the 1920s by Blériot in order to meet the requirements of a French government program for a light fighter plane type designated as "Jockey".

The first prototype was flown on 23 August 1927. It featured a wooden fuselage of monocoque construction and metal wings skinned in fabric. This prototype was destroyed in a crash and a second prototype followed. Even after the French government dropped interest in the program seeking a light fighter for the French Air Force, André Herbemont designed a further prototype with an inverted sesquiplane wing configuration.

Operational history
Despite flight demonstrations in Romania and Greece no orders followed. André Herbemont would use his experience with the S.91 prototypes in order to develop the S.510, another biplane fighter which would go into production and would be later used by the French Air Force.

In 1936 at least one of the surviving S.91 prototypes ended up in the Spanish Republican Air Force.

Variants

S.91 LegerPowered by a  Hispano-Suiza 12Hb V-12 water-cooled engine with twin-leg radiators mounted on the undercarriage, (1 built).

S.91/1The S.91 Leger fitted with a frontal radiator design.

S.91/2The S.91/1 prototype fitted with a  Hispano-Suiza 12Gb W-12 water-cooled engine. It was displayed in Romania and Greece.

S.91/3The S.91/2 was fitted with a  Gnome-Rhône 9A Jupiter nine-cylinder air-cooled radial engine, (1 built).

S.91/4The S.91 Leger, fitted with a  Hispano-Suiza 12Mb V-12 engine, flew again on 4 July 1930 with some modifications, including radiators mounted on top of the upper wing.

S.91/5The sole S.91/3, fitted with a  Gnome-Rhône 9Ae Jupiter, which crashed on the day of its first flight killing the pilot.

S.91/6This S.91/4 conversion flew in November 1930 and differed from the prototype in having rounded wingtips, a lengthened fuselage and a tailplane lowered to the fuselage base. Later the tailplane was restored to its former position.

S.91/7A new prototype with inverted sesquiplane wing configuration in which only the lower wing had ailerons. It flew on 23 December 1931 and was fitted with a  Hispano-Suiza 12Mc V-12 engine.

S.91/8The S.91/7 prototype fitted with a supercharged Hispano-Suiza 12Xbrs engine and a variable-pitch Ratier propeller made its maiden flight on 20 August 1932.

S.91/9The S.91/8 became a testbed for Hispano-Suiza's engine-mounted  cannon, after being leased to the company in December 1932. Besides the cannon it was also fitted with a large-diameter Levasseur fixed-pitch propeller.

Operators 

Spanish Republican Air Force

Specifications (S.91 Leger)

See also

References

Bibliography

Further reading

 
 

1920s French fighter aircraft
Blériot aircraft
Biplanes
Single-engined tractor aircraft
Aircraft first flown in 1927